Saloum Cohen, also known as Shalom ben Amram ben Yitzhaq, (January 13, 1921 – February 9, 2004), served as the Samaritan High Priest from 2001 until his death.  He lived in Nablus in the West Bank and is buried in the cemetery of Kiryat Luza on Mount Gerizim. 

He was elected as a member of the Palestinian Legislative Council in 1996 out of three Samaritan candidates for their reserved seat (elected by all electors, not only by Samaritans).

His successor as High Priest is Elazar ben Tsedaka ben Yitzhaq.

Sources
 "The High Priest, Shalom, son of Amram, son of Issac has passed away", The Samaritan Update III, 13 (February 12, 2004)
 "Shalom b. Amram, the Samaritan High Priest is dead. The new High Priest is Elazar b. Tsedaka", The Samaritan Update III, 14 (February 26, 2004)
 "The Samaritan Delegation", The Samaritan Update (March 28, 2002)

2004 deaths
1921 births
People from Nablus
Samaritan high priests
Members of the 1996 Palestinian Legislative Council
Arab people in Mandatory Palestine